George Hunt (c. 1906 – c. 1946) was an American jazz trombonist with the Count Basie Orchestra in the late-1930s.

Career 
Born in Chicago, Hunt's career began in Bennie Moten's band in 1932. After Moten's death in 1935 he joined the Count Basie Orchestra, traveling to perform in New York City with them in 1936. He left the Basie band the following year, and joined Fletcher Henderson before leaving in 1938. He returned to Chicago, and later that year performed in the Earl Hines band. He also played with Artie Starck and Erskine Tate.

Personal life 
Hunt committed suicide in Chicago in about 1946.

Discography

With Count Basie
The Original American Decca Recordings (GRP, 1992)

References

1900s births
1946 suicides
Year of birth uncertain
Year of death uncertain
American jazz trombonists
Male trombonists
Musicians from Chicago
Suicides in Illinois
20th-century American musicians
20th-century trombonists
Jazz musicians from Illinois
20th-century American male musicians
American male jazz musicians